Filipino New Zealanders, colloquially known as KiwiPinos, refers to New Zealanders who migrated from the Philippines or descendants born in New Zealand of Filipino ancestry.

The 1936 New Zealand census recorded six New Zealand residents born in the Philippines. The country's intake of Filipino students began to increase in 1960, under the Colombo Plan; however, even as late as 1981, there were only 405 Filipinos in New Zealand. It was not until the 1990s that highly populated regions such as Wellington and Auckland (especially the suburbs of Henderson and Mount Roskill) began to see exponential growth in their respective Filipino communities. The communities themselves are known for their many Philippine-related celebrations, particularly the celebration of Philippine Independence Day every year on the Sunday nearest to 12 June. In April 2008, New Zealand's embassy indicated that they would like to increase the intake of nurses and engineers from the Philippines. In 2013 the Census recorded 40,350 people, or 1.0 percent of the population, Filipino New Zealanders.

Demographics 
There were 72,612 people identifying as being part of the Filipino ethnic group at the 2018 New Zealand census, making up 1.5% of New Zealand's population. This is an increase of 32,262 people (80.0%) since the 2013 census, and an increase of 55,674 people (328.7%) since the 2006 census. Some of the increase between the 2013 and 2018 census was due to Statistics New Zealand adding ethnicity data from other sources (previous censuses, administrative data, and imputation) to the 2018 census data to reduce the number of non-responses.

There were 34,770 males and 37,845 females, giving a sex ratio of 0.919 males per female. The median age was 32.5 years, compared with 37.4 years for New Zealand as a whole; 14,838 people (20.4%) were aged under 15 years, 16,914 (23.3%) were 15 to 29, 39,123 (53.9%) were 30 to 64, and 1,740 (2.4%) were 65 or older.

In terms of population distribution, 45.2% of Filipino New Zealanders lived in the Auckland region, 28.9% lived in the North Island outside the Auckland region, and 25.9% lived in the South Island. The Kaipātiki local board area of Auckland had the highest concentration of Filipino people at 5.4%, followed by the Maungakiekie-Tāmaki local board area (3.9%) and the Ashburton District (3.8%). The Chatham Islands and Great Barrier Island had the lowest concentrations, recording no Filipino people in their respective areas.

New Zealand Ambassadors to the Philippines

Notable people

 Lynette Forday, actress & reporter
 Paulo Garcia, Member of Parliament from 2019
 Monina Hernandez, Nursing Council of New Zealand Board Member & Member of Parliament Candidate in the 2020 Elections
 James Roque, stand-up comedian
 Aileen Dela Rosa, Commercial model (MTF Finance, McDonald’s, Rockit Apple), Film & TV talent (Netflix’s Sweet Tooth & One of Us Is Lying), Power Rangers Dino Fury, TVNZ’s The Jonah Lomu’s Story and Runaway Millionaires, Mrs Universe NZ 2019 Finalist, Nadene Lomu Cosmetics ad model.

See also

New Zealand–Philippines relations

References

External links
Philippine Embassy in New Zealand

Asian New Zealander
 
New Zealand